Onda is a Portuguese sportswear brand founded in Barcelos, Portugal. It is the official provider of sportswear to the Olympic Committee of Portugal.

History 
The brand Onda started in Barcelos, Portugal, in 1999. The company P&R Têxteis, S.A., that already produced sports equipment for over 20 years, decided to create its own sportswear brand. It was named Onda (which means, in Portuguese, Wave), associating it with the sea and aquatic sports. The first equipment to be produced were essentially for thermal protection.

Products 
Onda Bikewear
Onda Triathlon
Surfwear Collection
Wetsuits Collection

References

External links
  (in English)

Sporting goods manufacturers of Portugal
Portuguese brands
Surfwear brands
Sportswear brands
Swimwear manufacturers
Clothing companies established in 1999
1999 establishments in Portugal